The Chicago Slaughter were an American professional football team based in Hoffman Estates, Illinois. Having been inactive since 2013, the franchise was a part of the CIFL from 2007 to 2009, winning the championship in 2009. The Slaughter joined the Indoor Football League at the start of the 2010 season. The Slaughter played their home games at the Sears Centre in Hoffman Estates.

Team history

Formation of the team
The original team name was considered to be the "Foxes", until Steve McMichael suggested they should have a name which reflected the working people of Chicago like the meatpackers of the old Chicago Stockyards. They play their home games at the Sears Centre in Hoffman Estates, Illinois. The team was originally intended to be a part of United Indoor Football, but did not join due to a dispute with the league.

The team interviewed William "The Refrigerator" Perry and Steve McMichael from the 1985 Chicago Bears Super Bowl XX championship team for the head coaching position. The aim was to appeal to local fans' affinity for McMichael and Perry and to take advantage of McMichael's love of hard-nosed, tough football. McMichael accepted the job as head coach, while Perry rejected the offer as Director of Football Operations (citing no desire to relocate back to Chicago).

2007–2009

During the team's inaugural 2007 season in the CIFL, the Slaughter recorded an overall record of 10–4. After going 9–3 in the regular season, the Slaughter reached the divisional semi-finals in the league playoffs.

The 2008 season saw the Chicago Slaughter suffer a slow start, going 2–3 in their first 5 games.  However, the Slaughter rallied around head coach Steve McMichael and won 6 out of their next 7 games to finish the regular season at 8–4, winning the Western division title.  Unfortunately, the Slaughter then suffered a disappointing first round playoff loss to divisional rival, Rock River, to end their season.

In 2009, the Slaughter signed seven players from the Chicago Rush when the Arena Football League cancelled the 2009 season, including Donovan Morgan, Reggie Gray, Bobby Sippio, and eventual CIFL league MVP Russ Michna. The Chicago Slaughter averaged over 65 points per game and outscored their opponents by almost an average of 30 points per game, going 14-0 for the season. On June 27, 2009, the Slaughter won the CIFL championship.

After the completion of the 2009 season, rumors began circulating that the Slaughter would be leaving the CIFL to join the IFL for the 2010 season. On October 27, 2009, the Chicago Slaughter announced that it was moving to the Indoor Football League, a much larger and more national league.

2010
On January 7, 2010, the Chicago Slaughter announced that Jarrett Payton, son of NFL running back Walter Payton, would be playing for the team in 2010. In February 2010, former Chicago Bears quarterback Jim McMahon joined the Chicago Slaughter as new team owner.

2012

2013

The team signed Juice Williams to be their quarterback.

2014
For the 2014 season, the Slaughter re-joined the CIFL. Before the season began, the Slaughter announced that they would not play the 2014 season. By this time, the Slaughter had ceased operations.

Notable players

Final roster

Former players
 L. J. Castile
 Reggie Gray
 Jon Kowalyshen
 Russ Michna
 Donovan Morgan
 Jarrett Payton
 Matt Rahn
 Dennison Robinson
 Bobby Sippio
 Sidney Lewis
 Juice Williams
 Nick Cosentino
 Tim McManigal

Awards and honors
The following is a list of all Chicago Slaughter players who have won league Awards

Notable coaches

Head coaches
Note: Statistics are correct through the end of the 2013 CIFL season.

Coaching staff

Season-by-season

References

External links

 Official website

 
2006 establishments in Illinois
2014 disestablishments in Illinois